Omm ol Safayeh-ye Yek (also Romanized as Omm ol Şafāyeh-ye Yek) is a village in Gazin Rural District, Raghiveh District, Haftgel County, Khuzestan Province, Iran. At the 2006 census, its population was 89, in 17 families.

References 

Populated places in Haftkel County